The 1966 Memphis State Tigers football team represented Memphis State College (now known as the University of Memphis) as an independent during the 1966 NCAA University Division football season. In its ninth season under head coach Billy J. Murphy, the team compiled a 7–2 record and outscored opponents by a total of 121 to 96. The team played its home games at Memphis Memorial Stadium in Memphis, Tennessee. 

The team's statistical leaders included Terry Padgett with 348 passing yards, Terry Padgett with 539 rushing yards, Dale Brady with 176 receiving yards, and Tom Wallace with 36 points scored.

Schedule

References

Memphis State
Memphis Tigers football seasons
Memphis State Tigers football